František Kardaus (March 25, 1908 in Hořesedly, Bohemia – February 20, 1986 in Velká Chuchle near Prague) was a Czechoslovak industrial designer and graphic artist.

Life 

Kardaus  attended schools in Kolešovice, Bohemia. Later he studied in the atelier of Alois Mudruňka, Professor at Uměleckoprůmyslová škola in Prague.  In 1927 he worked for  Eduard Böhm & Co., in Berlin.  Between 1928-30 he studied graphic art and industrial design at  Academie de la Grande Chaumiére in Paris.  Till 1934 he worked there at Leon Boue, architect.  In 1934 he returned to Prague and worked as an independent designer gaining a number of prizes for his poster designs. Kardaus collaborated with Czech automobile manufacturers Tatra, Škoda, Josef Walter a spol. and Československá zbrojovka. After the war in 1947 he was a graphic artist for B a R (Josef Burjanek a Remo - Reklama a móda), and worked again for  the nationalized Tatra, Tesla and other state enterprises. He collaborated on the design of Tatra 87 Diplomat, Tatra 600 and Tatra 603 cars, Tatra trolleybuses T400, and T401 and Tatra trams T1, T2, T3, KT4 and T5. Kardaus designed a number of film posters and produced graphic designs for Motokov, Strojexport, Mototechna, Staropramen companies.

See also 
 Tatra

References

 František Kardaus 1
 František Kardaus 2

Czechoslovak industrial designers
1908 births
1986 deaths
Alumni of the Académie de la Grande Chaumière